Tetyana Kob (also transliterated Tetiana, born 25 October 1987) is a Ukrainian female boxer.

She competed at the 2016 Summer Olympics in Rio de Janeiro, in the women's flyweight.

References

External links
 
 
 
 
 

1987 births
Living people
Ukrainian women boxers
Olympic boxers of Ukraine
Boxers at the 2016 Summer Olympics
European Games competitors for Ukraine
Boxers at the 2015 European Games
Boxers at the 2019 European Games
Flyweight boxers
21st-century Ukrainian women